Élancourt is a commune in the Yvelines department, and the Île-de-France region, north central France. It is located in the western suburbs of Paris, 30.6 km (19.0 mi) from the center of Paris, in the "new town" of Saint-Quentin-en-Yvelines.

Transport

Élancourt is not linked directly to the Paris Métro, RER, or suburban rail network. The closest station to Élancourt is La Verrière station on the Transilien La Défense and Transilien Paris-Montparnasse suburban rail lines. This station is located in the neighbouring commune of La Verrière, 1.4 km (0.9 mi) from the town center of Élancourt.

Population

Tourism
France Miniature is a tourist attraction in Élancourt featuring scale models of major French landmarks and monuments in an outdoor park.

Education
The commune has 13 preschools and 10 elementary schools.

Public junior high schools in Élancourt:
Collège de l’Agiot
Collège de la Clef de Saint-Pierre
Collège Louis Pergaud

In addition the community is served by Collège Alexandre Dumas and two public senior high schools/sixth form colleges, Lycée Dumont d’Urville and Lycée Polyvalent des 7 Mares, all in nearby Maurepas.

Versailles Saint-Quentin-en-Yvelines University provides tertiary educational services in the area.

Twin towns – sister cities
Élancourt is twinned with:
 Laubach, Germany, since 1975
 Cassina de' Pecchi, Italy, since 1997
 Gräfenhainichen, Germany, since 2003
 Attard, Malta

See also
Communes of the Yvelines department

References

External links

 http://www.ville-elancourt.fr/

Communes of Yvelines
Saint-Quentin-en-Yvelines
Venues of the 2024 Summer Olympics
Olympic cycling venues